Scottish Value Management is a fund manager based in Edinburgh. The firm was founded in 1990 by Colin McLean, his wife Margaret Lawson, and Donald Robertson.

References

1990 establishments in Scotland
Investment management companies of the United Kingdom
Financial services companies established in 1990
Companies based in Edinburgh